Hedda Maria Emerence Adelaïde Elisabeth Ekman, née Åkerhielm (b. 18 December 1862 in Axbergs församling, Örebro län, d. 25 May 1936 in Hedvig Eleonora Parish, Stockholms län), credited as Elisabeth Ekman was a Swedish botanist, noted for her study of the genus Draba.

Written works

References

1862 births
1936 deaths
19th-century Swedish botanists
19th-century Swedish women scientists
20th-century Swedish botanists
Swedish women botanists
20th-century Swedish women scientists